Rosinski or Rosiński (feminine: Rosińska; plural: Rosińscy) is a Polish surname. Notable people with this surname include:

 Bill Rosinski, American sportscaster
 Grzegorz Rosiński (born 1941), Polish comic book artist
 Tomasz Rosiński (born 1984), Polish handball player
 Vladimir Rosinski, musician
 Wojciech Rosiński (born 1955), Polish basketball player
 Zofia Dziurzyńska-Rosińska (1896–1979), Polish painter

See also
 
 Rosinsky

Polish-language surnames